Michael Robert Hebert (January 7, 1944 – October 21, 2019) was an American volleyball coach.  He is considered to be one of the "architects" of modern high-competitive professional volleyball. Hebert coached the Pittsburgh (1976–1979) men and women teams, New Mexico (1980–1982) women's team, Illinois (1983–1995) women's team, and Minnesota (1996–2010) women's team before announcing his retirement at the conclusion of the 2010 season.

Early life
Hebert was a native of Long Beach, California and attended college at the University of California, Santa Barbara, where he also played on the indoor volleyball squad.

In the mid 1970s, after being in the Peace Corps in Nigeria, he returned to the United States and received his PhD in Philosophy of Education at Indiana University Bloomington.

In 1975 he received a call to be the head coach of Women's varsity volleyball at the University of Pittsburgh, but he declined because he felt his only knowledge of the sport of volleyball was limited to men's volleyball. The university called back a month later and asked him to reconsider, when he accepted the job offer for $1,500. The position led to a full-time faculty position as the team went on to win division titles upon Hebert's first season.

Head coaching history

1976–1979: Pittsburgh
Hebert began his coaching career at the University of Pittsburgh, where he compiled a 128–53 mark with the women’s team and a 60–21 record as the men’s coach. He led the women's team to two EAIAW championships and two appearances in the AIAW National Championships. During his tenure, he won the EAIAW Eastern Region Coach of the Year award in 1978 and 1979.

1980–1982: New Mexico
Hebert coached the women’s team at New Mexico, notching a 60–57 record and advancing to the NCAA regionals in 1981 with a 26–17 record.

1983–1995 Illinois
At University of Illinois at Urbana–Champaign, Hebert led the Fighting Illini to two NCAA Final Four appearances (1987 & 1988) and four Big Ten titles. During the 1988 season, Illinois became the first volleyball team east of the Mississippi River to be rated No. 1 in the nation.

Hebert coached Mary Eggers from 1985–1988, who was the Big Ten Player of the Year for three consecutive years, as well as Nancy Brookhart, who shared the honor with Eggers in 1987. It remains the only time that a co-Big Ten Player of the Year was shared with two players on the same team.

In 1985, Hebert received the American Volleyball Coaches Association highest honor, as he was named the National Coach of the Year. From 1985–1988, Hebert was the president of the AVCA.

1996–2011: Minnesota

At Minnesota, Hebert led the Gophers to one Big Ten title (2002), and three NCAA Final Four appearances in 2003, 2004 and 2009. He has coached two Big Ten Players of the Year, Nicole Branagh (2000) and Cassie Busse (2004). In 2004, Hebert led Minnesota to the program's first ever national championship match, finishing as national runners-up. Briefly in 2004, the Gophers were ranked #1 in the coaches poll, the first time in program history that Minnesota claimed the top spot.

In Hebert’s 15 years at Minnesota, the Gophers are 381–137, 211–89 in the Big Ten and have participated in 11 NCAA Tournaments.

Hebert has produced two Olympians, Lindsey Berg, who made Olympic appearances in 2004 and 2008 for the indoor team, and Nicole Branagh, who appeared in the 2008 Olympics with Elaine Youngs for beach volleyball.

In 2006, Hebert was inducted into the AVCA Hall of Fame.

International coaching
In the summer of 2003, Hebert coached the U.S. National Team to a bronze medal at the Pan American Games.

Hebert served as head coach of the U.S. women’s team competing at the 1991 World University Games in Sheffield, England. The USA women’s team also competed in the 1991 Pan American Games in Havana, Cuba. Hebert traveled to the 1989 Canada Cup and 1990 Cuba Cup as part of a series of assignments with the U.S. National Team.

Personal
Hebert received his Bachelor's degree in Sociology from the University of California, Santa Barbara in 1966, and his Ph.D. in Philosophy of Education from the University of Indiana in 1974. He is the author of two books, including a 1993 co-written autobiography (with Dave Johnson) titled The Fire Still Burns. 

Hebert died on October 21, 2019 at the age of 75 and is survived by his wife, Sherry, two daughters; Becky and Hillary, and three grandchildren; Mateo, Farris and Aliya.

Awards and honors
2006 – AVCA Hall of Fame induction
2003 – Volleyball Magazine National Coach of the Year
2002 – AVCA Mideast Region Coach of the Year, Big Ten Coach of the Year
1999 – AVCA District II Coach of the Year, Big Ten Coach of the Year (Minn.)
1988 – Big Ten Coach of the Year (Ill.)
1986 – Big Ten Coach of the Year (Ill.)
1985 – AVCA National Coach of the Year (Ill.)
1980 – Intermountain Conference Coach of the Year (New Mex.)
1979 – EAIAW Eastern Region Coach of the Year (Pitt)
1978 – EAIAW Eastern Region Coach of the Year (Pitt)

See also
List of college women's volleyball coaches with 700 wins

References

1944 births
2019 deaths
Sportspeople from Long Beach, California
Writers from Long Beach, California
Peace Corps volunteers
American volleyball coaches
American men's volleyball players
Illinois Fighting Illini women's volleyball coaches
Minnesota Golden Gophers women's volleyball coaches
New Mexico Lobos women's volleyball coaches
Pittsburgh Panthers volleyball coaches
University of Pittsburgh faculty
Indiana University Bloomington alumni
UC Santa Barbara Gauchos men's volleyball players
Volleyball players from Long Beach, California